Epichoristodes dorsiplagana is a species of moth of the family Tortricidae. It is found in KwaZulu-Natal, South Africa.

References

Moths described in 1881
Archipini